The 39th Annual Creative Arts Emmy Awards presented by the National Academy of Television Arts and Sciences (NATAS), "recognizes outstanding achievement in all fields of daytime television production and are presented to individuals and programs broadcast from 2:00 a.m.—6:00 p.m. during the 2011 calendar year".

The 39th Annual Creative Arts Emmy Awards ceremony was held at the Westin Bonaventure in Los Angeles on June 17, 2012. General Hospital won the most awards, with a total of five wins including Outstanding Drama Series and Outstanding Drama Series Directing Team and other Creative Arts Emmy Awards. The soap opera also had  the most awards with a total of 23 (including Creative Arts Emmy Awards). Anthony Geary won its seventh win in the Outstanding Lead Actor in a Drama Series category. Live! with Regis and Kelly won in the Outstanding Talk Show Entertainment category for its last season. June Foray won for Outstanding Performer in an Animated Program at age 94, becoming the oldest competitive winner in Emmy history. The Lifetime Achievement Award was presented to television producer Bill Geddie.

Winners and nominees

In the lists below, the winner of the category is in bold.

Notes

  The Bold and the Beautiful & The Young and the Restless tied.
  All My Children and The Young and the Restless tied.
  All 3 tied.
  Green Screen Adventures & Semi-Homemade Cooking with Sandra Lee tied.

References

External links
 

039 Creative Arts
Daytime Emmy Awards
Emmy Awards